Velvet spiders (family Eresidae) are a small group (about 130 species in 9 genera) of spiders almost entirely limited to the Old World, with exception of a few species known from Brazil. In Europe some are commonly called the ladybird spiders

Description 
This family can sometimes be confused with the jumping spiders, or those in the Palpimanidae family. These spiders are usually black or brown in color, thought they can also have brighter colors as pictured. As their common name implies they can look quite smooth and velvety. They usually live in silken tubes under objects, or underground, but the genus Stegodyphus, builds silken nests.

Identification 
They can be distinguished from most species except the Penestomidae by their semi-rectangular carapace and clypeal hood. They can be distinguished from Penestomidae by the eye arrangement, straight anterior eye row and strongly recurved posterior eye row, with the median eyes close together.

Social Behavior 
Some species are nearly eusocial, lacking only a specialized caste system and a queen. They cooperate in brood rearing, unlike most other spiders except for some African agelenid spiders in the genus Agelena, Monocentropus balfouri and a few others. Female velvet spiders exhibit a remarkable type of maternal care unique among arachnids. Upon the birth of her brood, the mother spider liquefies her internal organs and regurgitates this material as food. Once her capability to liquefy her insides is exhausted, the young sense this and consume the mother. 

Spiders of the genus Stegodyphus genus, such as Stegodyphus sarasinorum in India, are known for their elaborate and robust nests and their colony integrity.

Genera

The genus Penestomus was previously placed in Eresidae as the subfamily Penestominae, but was elevated to its own family, Penestomidae, in 2010. , the World Spider Catalog accepts the following genera:

Adonea Simon, 1873 — Portugal, Algeria, Israel
Dorceus C. L. Koch, 1846 — Africa, Asia
Dresserus Simon, 1876 — Africa
Eresus Walckenaer, 1805 — Africa, Asia, Europe
Gandanameno Lehtinen, 1967 — Namibia, South Africa, Malawi
Loureedia Miller, Griswold, Scharff, Řezáč, Szűts & Marhabaie, 2012 — Africa, Asia
Paradonea Lawrence, 1968 — Namibia, Botswana, South Africa
Seothyra Purcell, 1903 — Africa
Stegodyphus Simon, 1873 — Africa, Asia, Brazil

See also
 List of Eresidae species

References

 Lehtinen, P.T. (1967): Classification of the cribellate spiders and some allied families, with notes on the evolution of the suborder Araneomorpha. Ann. Zool. Fenn. 4: 199-468.
 Dippenaar-Schoeman, A.S. (1989): The African species of the subfamily Penestominae (Araneae: Eresidae): with description of two new species. Phytophylactica 21: 131-134.

External links

Family Eresidae (Velvet Spiders)
Platnick, N.I. 2005. World Spider Catalog